The Theban Tomb TT211 is located in  Deir el-Medina, part of the Theban Necropolis, on the west bank of the Nile, opposite to Luxor.

TT211 is the burial place of an ancient Egyptian named Paneb, who lived during the 19th Dynasty as a servant of the Lord of the Two Lands in the Place of Truth. Paneb would have lived in Deir el-Medina during the reign of Ramesses II.

Paneb was the son of the servant of the Lord of the Two Lands in the Place of Truth named Nefersenut and his wife Iuy. Ḥe was the grandson of Kasa (TT10). Paneb was married to the Lady of the house Wabet

See also
 List of Theban tombs

References

Theban tombs
Nineteenth Dynasty of Egypt